John Leonard Murphy (March 23, 1895 – August 17, 1972) was an American track and field athlete who competed in the 1920 Summer Olympics. He was born in Portland, Oregon and died in Midland, Michigan. In 1920, he finished fifth in the high jump competition.

References

External links

1895 births
1972 deaths
American male high jumpers
Olympic track and field athletes of the United States
Athletes (track and field) at the 1920 Summer Olympics
Sportspeople from Midland, Michigan
Notre Dame Fighting Irish men's track and field athletes